Uzi Landau (born 2 August 1943) is an Israeli politician and systems analyst. He served as a member of the Knesset for Likud between 1984 and 2006, and for Yisrael Beiteinu between 2009 and 2015. He also held several ministerial posts, including Minister of Public Security, Minister in the Prime Minister's Office, Minister of Energy and Water Resources and Minister of Tourism.

Biography
Landau was born in Haifa during the Mandate era. He served in the Paratroopers Brigade of the Israel Defense Forces, and reached the rank of Major. He gained a BSc and MSc from the Technion in mathematics, and a PhD in engineering from the Massachusetts Institute of Technology. He worked at the Technion, was director-general of the Israel Ministry of Transport and also a member of the board of El Al.

In 1984 he was elected to the Knesset on the Likud list, and during his first term he chaired the Subcommittee for Soviet Jewry. He retained his seat in the 1988 elections, after which he became chair of the Subcommittee for the Defense budget. Re-elected in 1992, 1996 and 1999, he served as chair of the Foreign Affairs and Defense Committee from 1996 until 1999, when he became chairman of the State Control Committee.

In 2001, he was appointed Minister of Public Security by Ariel Sharon and retained his place in the cabinet after the 2003 elections, when he was appointed Minister in the Prime Minister's Office. He resigned his post in October 2004 due to his objections to Israel's unilateral disengagement plan, and ran for the Leadership of the Likud in 2005, before dropping out and endorsing Benjamin Netanyahu in December. He was placed fourteenth on the Likud list for the 2006 elections, but lost his seat as Likud won only 12 seats.

In 2008 he announced that he was joining Yisrael Beiteinu. He was placed second on the party's list for the 2009 elections, and was returned to the Knesset as the party won 15 seats. After Yisrael Beiteinu joined the Likud-led coalition, Landau was appointed Minister of National Infrastructure (after which he changed its name to the Ministry of Energy and Water).

On 12 October 2011, Landau was one of only three cabinet ministers to vote against the proposal to swap 1,027 convicted Palestinian prisoners for captured Israeli soldier Gilad Shalit. He called the deal a 'great victory for terrorism'. He was re-elected in the 2013 elections, after which he was appointed Minister of Tourism.

In December 2014 he announced that he was retiring from politics, and would not contest the 2015 elections.

References

External links

1943 births
Living people
Israeli civil servants
Israeli corporate directors
Israeli Jews
Israeli soldiers
Jewish Israeli politicians
Jews in Mandatory Palestine
Likud politicians
MIT School of Engineering alumni
Members of the 11th Knesset (1984–1988)
Members of the 12th Knesset (1988–1992)
Members of the 13th Knesset (1992–1996)
Members of the 14th Knesset (1996–1999)
Members of the 15th Knesset (1999–2003)
Members of the 16th Knesset (2003–2006)
Members of the 18th Knesset (2009–2013)
Members of the 19th Knesset (2013–2015)
Ministers of Public Security of Israel
Ministers of Tourism of Israel
People from Haifa
Technion – Israel Institute of Technology alumni
Academic staff of Technion – Israel Institute of Technology
Yisrael Beiteinu politicians